John Henry is the fifth studio album by American alternative rock group They Might Be Giants. It was released in 1994. It is the first album by They Might Be Giants to include a full band arrangement, rather than synthesized and programmed backing tracks. The album's name, a reference to the man versus machine fable of John Henry, is an allusion to the band's fundamental switch to more conventional instrumentation, especially the newly established use of a human drummer instead of a drum machine.

John Henry is TMBG's longest record and was the band's highest-charting adult album, having peaked at #61 on the Billboard 200, until 2011's Join Us, which peaked at #32. In 2013, the album was reissued across a double LP by Asbestos Records.

Lyrical themes
The lyrics to the song "AKA Driver" refer to a "NyQuil driver". John Flansburgh offered an explanation of the legal issue with the inclusion of a brand name: 

"I Should Be Allowed to Think" excerpts the first line ("I saw the best minds of my generation destroyed by madness, starving, hysterical") of the poem Howl by Allen Ginsberg. The song is also, according to its author, John Linnell, an example of the use of an "unreliable narrator". "Meet James Ensor" refers to an eccentric Belgian expressionist painter whose works excited John Flansburgh. In an interview, Flansburgh explained that "the line 'Dig him up and shake his hand' is actually very specific – a parallel idea to a lot of his paintings which involve resurrections, skeletons and puppets being animated. [...] With the song, I'm trying to encapsulate the issues of his life – an eccentric guy who became celebrated and was soon left behind as his ideas were taken into the culture and other people became expressionists." "Why Must I Be Sad?" is a string of references to Alice Cooper song titles and lyrics, involving several titles from the Billion Dollar Babies album including "No More Mr. Nice Guy," "I Love the Dead," and others.

Appearances in other media
Instrumental excerpts from "No One Knows My Plan" and "The End of The Tour" were used as the opening and closing themes, respectively, during the first season of the animated variety show Cartoon Planet in 1995.

Track listing

Personnel
John Henry is the first album credited to They Might Be Giants as a full band, rather than a duo:
 John Flansburgh – vocals, guitar
 John Linnell – vocals, keyboard, accordion, horns
 Brian Doherty – drums, percussion
 Tony Maimone – bass guitar, ukulele
 Graham Maby – bass guitar on tracks 11 & 14

Additional musicians
 Robert Quine – guitar solos on tracks 3 & 11
 Hudson Shad – vocals on track 10

References

External links
 John Henry at This Might Be a Wiki
 John Henry HyperCard Stack Emulator - A web-based recreation of the band's HyperCard promotional tool

1994 albums
Elektra Records albums
They Might Be Giants albums
Albums produced by Paul Fox (record producer)